Zereshkuh (also Romanized as Zereshḵūh) is a village in Howmeh Rural District, in the Central District of Semnan County, Semnan Province, Iran. At the 2006 census, its population was 11, in four families.

References 

Populated places in Semnan County